The third-generation iPhone SE (also known as the iPhone SE 3 or the iPhone SE 2022) is a smartphone designed and developed by Apple Inc. It is part of the 15th generation of the iPhone, alongside the iPhone 13 / 13 Mini and iPhone 13 Pro / 13 Pro Max models. Apple announced the third-generation iPhone SE on March 8, 2022, which succeeded the second-generation iPhone SE. Pre-orders began on March 11, 2022. The phone was released afterwards on March 18, 2022. It was released with a starting price of US$429, a $30 increase over its predecessor.

The third-generation iPhone SE has the same dimensions and form factor as the second-generation iPhone SE. The iPhone SE has a similar design to the iPhone 8 and similar internal hardware components to the iPhone 13 series, including the A15 Bionic system-on-chip and 5G connectivity.

History 
Rumors of a third-generation iPhone SE stemmed on October 25, 2021.

The third-generation iPhone SE was announced as part of an Apple Event on March 8, 2022.

Design 

The iPhone SE features an aluminum frame, paired with a glass front and back. It also shares the same physical sizes and dimensions as the iPhone 8 and is externally identical, except for a centered Apple logo and the removal of the iPhone branding in the lower midsection.

The iPhone SE is available in three colors: Midnight, Starlight, and a Product Red edition. Midnight and Starlight replace Black and White respectively. The Product Red color is darker than it was on the predecessor. The colorways correspond to those of the iPhone 13.

Specifications

Hardware 
The iPhone SE incorporates the Apple A15 Bionic (5 nm) architecture system on a chip (SoC), with an integrated motion coprocessor and fifth-generation neural engine. It is available in three internal storage configurations: 64 GB, 128 GB, and 256 GB. It has 4 GB of RAM, an increase over the second-generation model's 3 GB of RAM. The third-generation iPhone SE has the same IP67 rating for dust and water resistance as its predecessor. The phone lacks the ultra-wideband features enabled by the U1 chip found in the iPhone 13 and 13 Pro. Despite the phone's smaller size, which may lead to increased thermal throttling, the SE's A15 SoC runs at the same peak CPU frequencies as the iPhone 13. Like its predecessor, the third-generation iPhone SE does not feature a standard 3.5 mm stereo headphone jack and keeps a home button.

Display 
The iPhone SE 3 features the same HD Retina display found on its predecessor, using IPS technology with True Tone and wide color gamut (Display P3). The display has a resolution of 1334 × 750 pixels, like the previous  iPhones. The pixel density is 326 PPI, the same as on all iPhones with LCDs since the introduction of the Retina display on the iPhone 4, excluding the Plus models. It can play HDR10 and Dolby Vision content despite not having an HDR-ready display, done by down-converting the HDR content to fit the display while still having some enhancements to dynamic range, contrast, and wide color gamut compared to standard content.

Camera 
The iPhone SE has a rear 12 MP camera with a single lens, similar to the single lens camera system of its predecessor, capable of recording 4K video at 24, 25, 30, or 60 fps, 1080p HD video at 25, 30 or 60 fps, or 720p HD video at 30 fps. The camera has an aperture of ƒ/1.8, autofocus, optical image stabilization, and a quad-LED True Tone flash. The phone can also take panoramas up to 63 MP, and shoot photos in burst mode. The front camera is 7 MP with an aperture of f/2.2 and autofocus, capable of shooting 1080p HD video at 25 or 30 fps and slow-motion video at 120 fps.

The third-generation SE adds several camera functions enabled by the A15 Bionic. Like the 13 and 13 Pro, the rear camera supports Smart HDR 4. The rear camera also supports extended dynamic range video up to 30 fps, stereo recording and cinematic video stabilization. Both the front and rear cameras of the iPhone SE support Portrait mode and Portrait Lighting. The SE's implementation of Portrait mode only natively supports images of humans, as the hardware does not produce depth maps through the use of focus pixels and instead relies on software-based machine learning. Like the 13 and 13 Pro, Portrait mode has depth control and an advanced bokeh effect (blurring effect of the out-of-focus background around the portrait). The third-generation SE supports Deep Fusion and Photographic Styles, but lacks support for some features such as Night Mode and Cinematic mode due to older sensor hardware.

Battery 
The third generation of the iPhone SE features a 2,018 mAh battery, up from 1,821 mAh on the predecessor. According to Apple, this enables an offline video playback time of 15 hours, up from 13 hours. This brings it up to par with the older but more expensive iPhone 12 Mini.

Software 

The iPhone SE was originally supplied with iOS 15.4.

The navigation gestures stay the same as they were on the iPhones before the iPhone X.

References

External links 
  – official website
 

IOS

Mobile phones introduced in 2022
Mobile phones with 4K video recording